Cretaceous Dawn is a science-fiction novel by sibling scientists Lisa M. Graziano and Michael S. A. Graziano, published in 2008 by Leapfrog Press (initially published as 'Hell Creek: 65 Million Years in the Past, the Journey Begins' under Trafford Publishing in 2006. The book contains 304 pages. Its story is set to a modern time and also to the prehistory of 65 million years ago (at the end of the Cretaceous period). It starts in the physics laboratory, where long-extinct beetles start to appear. Four people and a dog are then hurled 65 million years through the deep geologic time, to the ending era of the dinosaurs (Hell Creek formation). The main character - paleontologist Julian Whitney and his companions - have only one chance for their own rescue.

They must cross a thousand miles in the wilderness to reach their rescue point. Meanwhile, in the laboratory, a police chief by the name of Sharon Earles must solve the mystery of where did those people disappear. Two physicists try to determine what went wrong, but it is not clear if they really want missing people to return from primeval time. During their journey, Whithey and others will meet living popular dinosaurs like Triceratops, Ankylosaurus, Troodon, and of course, Tyrannosaurus. But they also meet another man, named Carl. This mysterious person is an enigma for them until the end of the book. Can they survive in the hostile world of the last dinosaurs?

References 
 Article about the book 
 Article about the book (2)

2008 American novels
Novels about dinosaurs
English-language novels
Novels about time travel
2008 science fiction novels
American science fiction novels
Novels set in prehistory